Old Brampton is a village in the civil parish of Brampton, in the county of Derbyshire, England. It lies 3 miles to the west of Chesterfield, on a spur of higher land between two small valleys. The North East Derbyshire ward is called Brampton and Walton. The population of this ward at the 2011 Census was 3,676. The Peak District National Park lies about 2 miles to the west.

In Culture
Old Brampton is mentioned in the Domesday Book as one of the manors belonging to Walter D'Aincourt.

References 

Villages in Derbyshire
Towns and villages of the Peak District
North East Derbyshire District